The Great Seattle Fire was a fire that destroyed the entire central business district of Seattle, Washington on June 6, 1889. The conflagration lasted for less than a day, burning through the afternoon and into the night, and during the same summer as the Great Spokane Fire and the Great Ellensburg Fire. Its population swelled during reconstruction, becoming the largest city in the newly admitted state of Washington.

Early Seattle

In the fall of 1851, the Denny Party arrived at Alki Point in what is now the state of Washington.  After spending a miserable winter on the western shores of Elliott Bay, the party relocated to the eastern shores and established the settlement that would become Seattle.  Early Seattle was dominated by the logging industry.  The combination of a safe bay and an abundance of coniferous trees made Seattle the perfect location for shipping lumber to California.  In 1852, Henry Yesler began construction of the first steam-powered mill in the Pacific Northwest. Because of the easy access to lumber, nearly every building was constructed of the affordable, but combustible timber.  Additionally, because the area was at or below sea level, the fledgling town was a frequent victim of massive floods, requiring buildings to be built on wooden stilts.  The town also used hollowed out scrap logs propped up on wooden braces as sewer and water pipes, increasing the combustible loading.

Events of the fire

At approximately 2:20 pm on June 6, 1889, an accidentally overturned glue pot in a carpentry shop started the most destructive fire in the history of Seattle. The next day, the Seattle Post-Intelligencer, operating out of temporary facilities in the wake of the fire, reported incorrectly that the incident began in "Jim McGough's paint shop, under Smith's boot and shoe store, at the corner of Front and Madison streets, in what was known as the Denny block"; a correction two weeks later said that it "actually started in the Clairmont and Company cabinet shop, below McGough's shop in the basement of the Pontius building", but the original error was often repeated, including in Murray Morgan's bestselling Seattle history book Skid Road (1951). The pot was tipped over by John Back, a 24-year-old Swede. The fire soon spread to the wood chips and turpentine covering the floor. Back attempted to douse the fire with water which only served to spread the fire further. The fire department arrived by 2:45, but by that time the area was so smokey that the source of the fire could not be determined.

Spread of fire
Fed by the shop's timber and an unusually dry summer, the blaze erupted and shortly devoured the entire block. A nearby liquor store exploded, and the alcohol fueled the flames. The fire quickly spread north to the Kenyon block and the nearby Madison and Griffith blocks. Wooden boardwalks carried the flames across streets to ignite other blocks.

A combination of ill-preparedness and unfortunate circumstances contributed to the great fire. Seattle's water supply was insufficient in fighting the giant inferno. Fire hydrants were sparsely located on every other street, usually connected to small pipes. There were so many hydrants in use during the fire that the water pressure was too weak to fight such a massive blaze. Seattle was also operated by a volunteer fire department, which was competent, but inadequate in extinguishing the fire.

Magnitude of destruction
By the morning of June 7, the fire had burned 25 city blocks, including the entire business district, four of the city's wharves, and its railroad terminals.  The fire would be called the most destructive fire in the history of Seattle. 
Despite the massive destruction of property, few to no deaths occurred. Some claim a young boy named James Goin was killed in the blaze although no reliable records have been found from that time. However, there were fatalities during the cleanup process and over 1 million rodents were killed. Total losses were estimated at nearly $20 million ($ in  dollars).

Reconstruction and recovery

Despite the magnitude of destruction, the rebuilding effort began quickly. Rather than starting over somewhere else, Seattle's citizens decided to rebuild. Seattle rebuilt from the ashes quickly, and the fire killed many rats and other vermin, thereby eliminating the city's rodent problems. A new building ordinance resulted in a downtown of brick and stone buildings, rather than wood.

In the year following the fire Seattle's population actually grew by nearly 20,000 to 40,000 inhabitants from the influx of people helping to recreate the city. Supplies and funds came from all over the West Coast to support the relief effort. The population increase made Seattle the largest city in Washington, making it a leading contender in becoming the terminus of the Great Northern Railway.

Post-fire reform
Seattle made many improvements in response to the fire. The Seattle Fire Department was officially established four months later to replace a volunteer organization with a paid force containing new firehouses and a new chief. The city took control of the water supply, increasing the number of hydrants and adding larger pipes. The advent of brick buildings to downtown Seattle was one of the many architectural improvements the city made in the wake of the fire. New city ordinances set standards for the thickness of walls and required "division walls" between buildings. These changes became principal features of post-fire construction and are still visible in Seattle's Pioneer Square district today, the present-day location of the fire.  At Pioneer Square, guided tours are also available to paying customers. Also at this location, visitors can tour the Seattle Underground, where they can visit the original street level (now basement level) of buildings and storefronts that were built after the fire.

See also

 Moran Brothers Shipyard — Robert Moran's shipyard whose predecessor was destroyed in the fire.

References

Further reading

 Andrews, Mildred Tanner, editor, Pioneer Square: Seattle's Oldest Neighborhood, University of Washington Press, Seattle and London 2005.
 Buerge, David, Seattle in the 1880s, Historical Society of Seattle and King County, Seattle 1986, pages 108–115.
 Ochsner, Jeffrey Karl, and Andersen, Dennis Alan, "After the Fire: The Influence of H. H. Richardson on the Rebuilding of Seattle, 1889-1894," Columbia 17 (Spring 2003), pages 7–15.
 Ochsner, Jeffrey Karl, and Andersen, Dennis Alan, Distant Corner: Seattle Architects and the Legacy of H.H.Richardson, University of Washington Press, Seattle and London 2003.
 Ochsner, Jeffrey Karl, and Andersen, Dennis Alan, "Meeting the Danger of Fire: Design and Construction in Seattle after 1889." Pacific Northwest Quarterly 93 (Summer 2002), pages  115–126.
 Warren, James R., The Day Seattle Burned: June 6, 1889, Seattle 1989.

External links 

University of Washington Libraries Austin, Charles W., The great Seattle fire of June 6, 1889: containing a succinct and complete account of the greatest conflagration on the Pacific coast.
University of Washington Libraries Digital Collections:
Boyd and Braas Photographs  88 photographs, ca. 1888–1893, of early Seattle, including the waterfront and street scenes, the Great Seattle fire of June 6, 1889, Madrona and Leschi parks, Native American hop pickers, and portraits of Seattle pioneers.
Asahel Curtis Photo Company Photographs Photographs (ca. 1850s-1940) depicting activities in Washington state, the Pacific Northwest, and Alaska and the Klondike.
Prosch Washington Views Album 207 images (ca. 1858-1903) collected and annotated by Thomas Prosch, one of Seattle's earliest pioneers. Images document scenes in Eastern Washington especially Chelan and vicinity, images of the waterfront, businesses, residences, and Seattle's early history including the Great Seattle Fire of 1889; see: pp. 48–56.
Seattle Photographs Ongoing database of over 1,700 historical photographs of Seattle with special emphasis on images depicting neighborhoods, recreational activities including baseball, the Great Seattle Fire of 1889, "The Great Snow of 1916", theaters and transportation.
HistoryLink.org John Caldbick, The Great Seattle Fire, Part 1, essay 21090
Seattle, WA The Great Seattle Fire, Jun 1889 at GenDisasters.com

1889 in Washington (state)
History of Seattle
Seattle
1889 fires in the United States
1889 disasters in the United States
Fires in Washington (state)